Mitromorpha granum is an extinct species of sea snail, a marine gastropod mollusk in the family Mitromorphidae.

Description
The length of the shell attains , its diameter .

Distribution
This extinct species is endemic to New Zealand and was found off the Whenuaturu Peninsula.

References

 Maxwell, P.A. (2009). Cenozoic Mollusca. pp. 232–254 in Gordon, D.P. (ed.) New Zealand inventory of biodiversity. Volume one. Kingdom Animalia: Radiata, Lophotrochozoa, Deuterostomia. Canterbury University Press, Christchurch.

External links
 Marwick, J. "The Tertiary Mollusca of the Chatham Islands including a generic revision of the New Zealand Pectinidae." Transactions of the New Zealand institute. Vol. 58. No. 4. 1928.

granum
Gastropods described in 1928
Gastropods of New Zealand